Tyrpophloeus populi is a species of bark beetle implicated in sudden aspen decline.

This beetle is tiny; adults measure about 2 millimeters.

References 

Scolytinae
Beetles described in 1915